"Lozin' Must" is a song by Swedish punk rock band Millencolin from the album For Monkeys. It was released as a single on 6 April 1997 by Burning Heart Records and Epitaph Records, including two B-sides from the album's recording sessions, "Israelites" and "Vixen". These two tracks were re-released in 1999 on the compilation album The Melancholy Collection. The U.S. version  of "Lozin' Must" released by Epitaph also includes a remix of "The Story of My Life", a song from the album Life on a Plate which had previously been released as a single. An accompanying music video for "Lozin' Must" was also filmed and released.

In Australia the song "Twenty Two" was released in place of "Lozin' Must" at the insistence of Shock Records, over concerns that "Lozin' Must" contained profanity.

Track listing

CD single (Europe)
"Lozin' Must"
"Israelites" (originally performed by Desmond Dekker)
"Vixen"

CD single (US)
"Lozin' Must"
"Israelites" 
"The Story of My Life" (remix)
"Vixen"

7" vinyl
Side A:
"Lozin' Must"
"Israelites" 
Side A:
"The Story of My Life" (remix)
"Vixen"

Personnel

Millencolin
Nikola Sarcevic - lead vocals, bass guitar
Erik Ohlsson - guitar
Mathias Färm - guitar
Fredrik Larzon - drums

References

Millencolin songs
1997 singles
1997 songs
Burning Heart Records singles
Epitaph Records singles
Songs written by Mathias Färm
Songs written by Nikola Šarčević
Songs written by Fredrik Larzon
Songs written by Erik Ohlsson (musician)